The  is a Japanese railway line operated by the private railway operator Nishi-Nippon Railroad (Nishitetsu), which connects Kurume and Asakura in Fukuoka Prefecture.

Stations

History
The  opened a  gauge line electrified at 600 V DC from Miyanojin to Kitano in 1915. The Kitano to Amagi section opened in 1921.
 
On 30 June 1924, the Mitsui Electric tramway was absorbed into the Kyushu Railway system, this line becoming the Mitsui Line. In 1942, the Kyushu Railway merged with the Kyushu Electric Railway, becoming the Nishi-Nippon (translates as West Japan) Railway.

In 1948, the line voltage was increased to 1,500 V DC, the same year through-running commenced with the Tenjin Ōmuta Line and the line was renamed the Amagi Line.

From 1 October 1989, wanman driver only operation commenced on the line.

References
This article incorporates material from the corresponding article in the Japanese Wikipedia.

Rail transport in Fukuoka Prefecture
Railway lines opened in 1921